Ribbit may refer to:

 Onomatopoeia for the sound that a frog makes.
 Ribbit (Pillow Pal), a plush toy frog made by Ty, Inc.
 Ribbit (telecommunications company), a telecommunications company based in Mountain View, California, acquired by BT Group in 2008
 Ribbit, 2010 Flash game by Nitrome
 Ribbit (film), a 2014 animated film
 The charging of forbidden loans and interest in Judaism

See also
 
 
 Croak (disambiguation)
 Rib (disambiguation)
 Rip It